Bagheshlu Mahalleh (also Romanized as Bāgheshlū Maḩalleh; also known as Bāghemsheh Maḩalleh and Bāghesh Maḩalleh-ye Ḩavīq) is a village in Haviq Rural District, Haviq District, Talesh County, Gilan Province, Iran. At the 2006 census, its population was 523, in 110 families.

Language 
Linguistic composition of the village.

References 

Populated places in Talesh County

Azerbaijani settlements in Gilan Province